John Salmon Ford (May 26, 1815 – November 3, 1897), better known as "Rip" Ford, was a member of the Republic of Texas Congress and later the Texas Senate, and mayor of Brownsville, Texas. He was also a Texas Ranger, a Confederate colonel, a doctor, a lawyer, and a journalist and newspaper owner. Ford commanded men during the Antelope Hills expedition, and he later commanded the Confederate forces in what was arguably the last engagement of the American Civil War, the Battle of Palmito Ranch on May 12–13, 1865. It was a Confederate victory, but as it occurred more than a month after Robert E. Lee's surrender, it did not affect the war's outcome.

Early life
Ford was born in Greenville District, South Carolina, but grew up in Lincoln County, Tennessee. His parents were William and Harriet Ford. When he was 16, he moved to Shelbyville, Tennessee, to study medicine. He met his wife, Mary Davis; however, the marriage ended in divorce. Ford then moved to Texas to fight for independence from Mexico.

Texas
Ford arrived in Texas in June 1836, too late to participate in the Texas Revolution. He served in the Texas army until 1838. He opened a medical practice in the east Texas town of San Augustine, where he practiced for eight years. He also studied law and passed the bar exam before winning election to the Texas legislature in 1844, advocating annexation by the United States. The following year he moved to Austin where he purchased the Texas National Register, renaming it the Texas Democrat.

When the Mexican–American War began, Ford enlisted in John Coffee Hays' regiment of Texas Mounted Rifles. He was promptly appointed a lieutenant and served as an adjutant and medical officer. Ford saw active duty with his regiment in Mexico, commanding a scout company for part of the time. Ford received the nickname 'Rip' for his peculiar inclusion of "Rest in peace" after each name when composing his company's casualty lists.

In 1849, with Robert Neighbors, Ford explored the country between San Antonio and El Paso and published a report and map of the route, which became known as the Ford and Neighbors Trail. Later the same year, he was made captain in the Texas Rangers and was stationed between the Nueces River and the Rio Grande, where he had numerous fights with Native Americans during 1850 and 1851. In 1850, he captured the war chief Carne Muerto, a son of Santa Anna. After his Ranger unit was disbanded, Ford participated in Jose Maria Jesus Carbajal's Merchant's War (1851-1852) as a colonel.

In 1852, Ford was elected to the Texas Senate, bought the Southwestern American, and established the State Times in 1853, which he sold in 1857.  Early in 1858, he accepted a commission as Senior Captain in the state troops and defeated hostile Native Americans in the Battle of Little Robe Creek on the Canadian River. Late in 1859, he was sent to the Rio Grande by Governor Hardin Richard Runnels at the head of 53 state troops (Texas Rangers), where he joined operations with Captain George Stoneman of the 2nd Cavalry and Captain Tobin's Texas Rangers against Juan Cortina in the Battle of Rio Grande City.

American Civil War
In 1861, Ford served as a member of the Secession Convention and initiated a trade agreement between Mexico and the Confederate States of America. As a Confederate State Army colonel, Ford commanded the Rio Grande Military District. In early April 1861, Ford commanded troops who defended Zapata County from invaders from Mexico who did not want Texas in the Confederacy in the Second Cortina War. They had entered Zapata County from Mexico and hanged the county judge. Several invaders were killed, marking the first deaths in defense of the Confederacy, about two weeks before the bloodless Battle of Fort Sumter. Between 1862 and 1865, Ford ran the Bureau of Conscription of the State, and engaged in border operations protecting Confederate-Mexican trade. After raising 1,300 troops, "The Cavalry of the West", Ford recaptured Fort Brown on July 30, 1864. His forces attacked U.S. soldiers a few miles above Palmito Ranch on September 9, 1864, forcing them to retreat to Brazos Island on September 12, 1864. In May 1865, Ford led Confederate forces in the Battle of Palmito Ranch, by some criteria the last battle of the American Civil War.

"Some of the Sixty-Second Colored Regiment were also taken. They had been led to believe that if captured they would either be shot or returned to slavery. They were agreeably surprised when they were paroled and permitted to depart with the white prisoners. Several of the prisoners were from Austin and vicinity. They were assured they would be treated as prisoners of war. There was no disposition to visit upon them a mean spirit of revenge."-Colonel John Salmon Ford, May 1865.

When Ford surrendered his command following the battle at Palmito Ranch, he urged his men to honor their paroles. He insisted that "the negro had a right to vote."

Post Civil War
Ford acted as a guide for the U.S. military operating against "cow-thieves and other disturbers of peace and quietude" and was a correspondent for the Galveston News. Later, he was assistant editor for the Brownsville Ranchero and wrote for the Brownsville Courier before establishing and publishing the Brownsville Sentinel.

Legacy 
 Ford was inducted to the Texas Military Hall of Honor in 2008.

See also

 List of American Civil War generals (Acting Confederate)

References

External links
 .
 Texas history entry about John Salmon Ford from the Biographical Encyclopedia of Texas published 1880, hosted by the Portal to Texas History.
 
  "FORD AND NEIGHBORS TRAIL," Handbook of Texas Online, accessed December 28, 2010.

Members of the Texas Ranger Division
Texas state senators
1815 births
1897 deaths
Confederate States Army officers
Confederate militia generals
People from Greenville County, South Carolina
People of Texas in the American Civil War
People of the Republic of Texas
Apache Wars
Lawmen of the American Old West
19th-century American politicians
People from San Augustine, Texas
Military personnel from Texas